Susan Cohn Rockefeller (born 1959) is an entrepreneur, conservationist, and filmmaker. She is the Founder and Editor-in-Chief of Musings. She also designs jewelry with themes that fit in with her work.

Biography 
She received her undergraduate degree from Hampshire College and her master's degree from New York University. Susan lives in New York City with her husband, David Rockefeller Jr. and her children. She met David while filming in Alaska in 2006 and they were married in 2008.

Rockefeller's films have explored a range of contemporary issues such as ocean acidification and the future of ocean health, PTSD and the use of music to heal, the confluence of race, poverty and illness; and global food sustainability. Her films have aired on HBO, PBS, and the Discovery Channel. Her 2009 film, Sea Change, received the NOAA 2010 Environmental Hero Award.

Susan sits on the boards of Oceana, Stone Barns Center for Food and Agriculture, We Are Family Foundation, and is a member of the Natural Resources Defense Council Global Leadership Council. She also done fundraising work for the South Fork Natural History Museum.

In 2018, Rockefeller was noted in the book, Rescuing Ladybugs by author Jennifer Skiff as “inspiring awareness” and “mobilizing action across a range of environmental and philanthropic causes as a conservationist and ocean advocate. In the book, Rockefeller credits a “moment of enlightenment inspired by the pteropod” to her passion in “helping others understand the fragility of our ecosystem.”

In December 2021, Rockefeller and her husband each contributed $5,000 to The Next 50, a liberal political action committee (PAC).

Filmography 
 The Baby Shower (1998)
 Green Fire: Lives of Commitment and Passion in a Fragile World (1998)
 Running Madness (2002)
 Richard Nelson's Alaska (2006)
 A Sea Change (2009)
 Striking a Chord (2010)
 Making Crooked Straight (2010)
 Mission of Mermaids (2012)
 Food For Thought, Food For Life (2015)

References

External links 
 Interview
 

1959 births
American women film directors
Living people
American women business executives
American business executives
American conservationists
Businesspeople from New York City
Activists from New York City
Film directors from New York City
21st-century American women